Eriophorum vaginatum, the hare's-tail cottongrass, tussock cottongrass, or sheathed cottonsedge, is a species of perennial herbaceous flowering plant in the sedge family Cyperaceae. It is native to bogs and other acidic wetlands throughout the Holarctic Kingdom. It is a 30–60 cm high tussock-forming plant with solitary spikes.

Description

Eriophorum vaginatum is a 30– to 60-cm-high tussock-forming plant with extremely narrow, almost hair-like leaves. On the flowering stems there is a single, inflated leaf-sheath, without a lamina, hence the species epithet ("sheath" is "vagina" in latin). The inflorescence is a dense, tufted, solitary spike. Fruiting stems elongate considerably, reaching well above the leaves.

Distribution and habitat

Eriophorum vaginatum occurs throughout much of the boreal and arctic zones of Eurasia and North America. It prefers acidic, moist to wet, peaty soil and may be dominant in bogs, poor fens and the heathlands of Western Europe. It is also common on the tundra.
Common in Scotland, it is sometimes referred to as draw-ling or drawmoss.

References

External links
Eriophorum vaginatum in Flora of North America
USDA PLANTS Profile

vaginatum
Flora of Asia
Flora of Europe
Flora of North America
Plants described in 1753
Taxa named by Carl Linnaeus